Natica marochiensis is a species of predatory sea snail, a marine gastropod mollusk in the family Naticidae, the moon snails.

Distribution
This marine species has a wide distribution. It can be found at the following locations:
 Mediterranean Sea
 Atlantic Ocean : Cape Verde, West Africa, Angola
 Caribbean Sea
 Gulf of Mexico
 Lesser Antilles
 Indian Ocean : Mozambique

Description
The maximum recorded shell length is 40 mm.

Habitat
Minimum recorded depth is 0 m. Maximum recorded depth is 94 m.

References

 Gofas, S.; Afonso, J.P.; Brandào, M. (Ed.). (S.a.). Conchas e Moluscos de Angola = Coquillages et Mollusques d'Angola. [Shells and molluscs of Angola]. Universidade Agostinho / Elf Aquitaine Angola: Angola. 140 pp.
 Rolán E., 2005. Malacological Fauna From The Cape Verde Archipelago. Part 1, Polyplacophora and Gastropoda. 
 Spencer, H.G., Marshall, B.A. & Willan, R.C. (2009). Checklist of New Zealand living Mollusca. pp 196–219 in Gordon, D.P. (ed.) New Zealand inventory of biodiversity. Volume one. Kingdom Animalia: Radiata, Lophotrochozoa, Deuterostomia. Canterbury University Press, Christchurch. 
 Rosenberg, G., F. Moretzsohn, and E. F. García. 2009. Gastropoda (Mollusca) of the Gulf of Mexico, Pp. 579–699 in Felder, D.L. and D.K. Camp (eds.), Gulf of Mexico–Origins, Waters, and Biota. Biodiversity. Texas A&M Press, College Station, Texas.
 Torigoe K. & Inaba A. (2011) Revision on the classification of Recent Naticidae. Bulletin of the Nishinomiya Shell Museum 7: 133 + 15 pp., 4 pls.

External links
 Gmelin J.F. (1791). Vermes. In: Gmelin J.F. (Ed.) Caroli a Linnaei Systema Naturae per Regna Tria Naturae, Ed. 13. Tome 1(6). G.E. Beer, Lipsiae
 Philippi, R. A. (1836). Enumeratio molluscorum Siciliae cum viventium tum in tellure tertiaria fossilium, quae in itinere suo observavit. Vol. 1. I-XIV, 1-303, Tab. XIII-XXVIII. Schropp, Berlin 
 Jousseaume, F. (1874). Description de quelques espèces nouvelles de coquilles appartenant aux genres Murex, Cypraea et Natica. Revue et Magasin de Zoologie. 3 (2): 3-25
 Kabat A.R. (2000) Results of the Rumphius Biohistorical Expedition to Ambon (1990). Part 10. Mollusca, Gastropoda, Naticidae. Zoologische Mededelingen 73(25): 345-380

Naticidae
Gastropods described in 1791
Taxa named by Johann Friedrich Gmelin
Molluscs of the Atlantic Ocean
Molluscs of the Mediterranean Sea
Molluscs of Angola
Molluscs of the Indian Ocean
Gastropods of Cape Verde
Invertebrates of Mozambique